Nightshade, released in Japan as  and stylized in all regions with the kanji 忍 behind the title, is an action video game for the PlayStation 2 (PS2), developed by Overworks and published by Sega in 2003. It is the eleventh game in the Shinobi series and follows the exploits of a female ninja named Hibana. The game is a sequel to the 2002 PS2 game Shinobi.

Story 
In Nightshade, the player plays as Hibana, a female counterpart to Shinobis Hotsuma. She is a government-employed ninja tasked with the elimination of members of the Nakatomi Corporation, which has unwittingly unleashed hellspawn upon futuristic Tokyo. She is also ordered to recover the shards of "Akujiki", the legendary cursed sword that Hotsuma used to seal the hellspawn the last time.

Characters 

The main character, Hibana was born to a branch family of the Oboro lineage, but due to being a girl, she was not allowed to vie for leadership of the clan, and was put up for adoption at an early age to a branch of the Oboro. She is a jaded ninja who was abandoned by Jimushi and now works for the government. The government modeled her sword and outfit after Hotsuma's, the main character of the previous game. Hibana also appears in the 3DS crossover role-playing game Project X Zone 2.

The Shinobi of Earth and Hibana's former master. One of the Oboro Clan elders, until he seceded and became a government agent. He would become disenchanted with the government and leave, becoming a Nakatomi Mercenary Ninja.

The Shinobi of Wind and the first Shinobi who confronts Hibana in Jimushi's gang. An honorable warrior who claims that Hibana is his 1,000th opponent.

The Shinobi of Fire and the second Shinobi who confronts Hibana. He is attracted to Hibana and wants her to kill him.

The Shinobi of Water and the third Shinobi who confronts Hibana. She is Jimushi's new apprentice and is essentially Hibana's replacement. However, she despises Hibana because Jimushi prefers her.

Voiced by: Toshitsugu Takashina (Alpha, Japanese), Masao Harada (Beta, Japanese), Hiroshi Iida (Final, Japanese), Casey Robertson (English)
The antagonist, a robotic ninja created by the Nakatomi group ordered to work with Jimushi and retrieve pieces of Akujiki. Although a soulless robot, he begins to have his own agenda with each piece of Akujiki he absorbs.

Gameplay 
Nightshade's missions are linear, and each one culminates in a battle against a challenging boss opponent. The core of Nightshade's gameplay is hack and slash, with accumulating combos on spawning enemies about the level. Using Hibana's arsenal of a katana (the primary weapon), short daggers (achieve less damage, but score a higher combo multiplier), shuriken (long range projectiles), and various ninjutsu spells, the game challenges the player to achieve as high a score as possible while eliminating the opposing threat.

Nightshade also includes aspects of platforming. With Hibana's ability to dash in mid-air, the game requires the player to use this ability to bypass holes and hazards. Game mechanics restrict Hibana to only a double-jump and an air-dash before she falls, requiring the player to strike enemies in mid-flight to stay in the air. By doing this, the player combines accuracy and timing to stay in the air continuously, or fall to their death.

If the player has a completed save file from Shinobi then Hotsuma, the protagonist of the previous game, is available as an optional playable character. He differs from Hibana in that he does not use daggers like her and is only able to use Akujiki, the sword he used in the previous game. Hotsuma plays exactly as before with the same arsenal of moves and operates under the same mechanics as he did in the previous game. He must always be finding and defeating enemies to feed their souls to Akujiki, or the cursed sword will devour his soul instead and kill him.

Development

Soundtrack 
The Nightshade soundtrack is based upon the Japanese techno of the previous iteration, Shinobi. All tracks were produced by Fumie Kumatani, Tomonori Sawada, Keiichi Sugiyama, Yutaka Minobe, Teruhiko Nakagawa, and Masaru Setsumaru of Sega Digital Studio. Nightshade did not see an official soundtrack release until July 2014, where it was released digitally on Amazon Music and iTunes.

Reception

Nightshade received "average" reviews according to the review aggregation website Metacritic. In Japan, Famitsu gave it a score of one nine and three eights for a total of 33 out of 40.

References

External links 
 
Official page at Sega 

Hardcore Gaming 101: Shinobi

2003 video games
Action video games
Hack and slash games
Overworks games
PlayStation 2 games
PlayStation 2-only games
Sega video games
Shinobi (series)
Video game sequels
Video games featuring female protagonists
Video games set in Tokyo
Video games about ninja
Video games developed in Japan